Diego Hernán Abal (born 28 December 1971) is an Argentine football referee. He refereed at 2014 FIFA World Cup qualifiers.

References

1971 births
Living people
Argentine football referees
21st-century Argentine people